De mujeres is a Venezuelan telenovela written by Isamar Hernández and produced by Radio Caracas Television in 1990.

Mimí Lazo and Carlos Olivier starred as the protagonists.

Plot
The three Marcano sisters have to navigate through life while fighting a macho world in order to realise their own ideals and live more balanced, independent lives.

Antonieta is a mother of two children and the dedicated wife to Luis Fernando, a womanizer whose infidelities are discovered after 17 years of marriage. Antonieta decides to ask for a divorce, but the issue becomes complicated with the family's economic problems and family pressures.

Adela is a very strong but suspicious woman with a husband who hides a past that will be uncovered on the day of their wedding.

Aurora, the youngest sister works as a journalist but has great fear towards men and intimacy.

Cast
Mimí Lazo as  Antonieta Marcano
Carlos Olivier as Luis Fernando
Victoria Roberts as Adela Marcano
Carlos Cámara Jr. as Enrique
Carolina Perpetuo as Aurora Marcano
Adolfo Cubas as Fucho
Néstor Maldonado as Gregorio
Petite Kutlesa as Lupita
Carlos José Cámara as Tito
Rosario Prieto as Leticia
Carlos Márquez as Don Pedro
Marcos Campos as Octavio
Rosita Vásquez as Hortencia
Yajaira Broccolo as Marcela
Yajaira Broccolo as Marcela
Félix Loreto as Carlos Alfaro
Olga Rojas as Viuda de Marcano
Ileana Jacket as Federica
Franklin Virgüez as Santiago
Karl Hoffman as Tulio
Luis Enrique Cañas as David
Francis Romero as Ingrid
Inés María Calero as Dulce María
Crisol Carabal as Socorro Montes
Leonardo Oliva as Don Manuel Baptista
Arístides Aguiar as Alejandro
Zulema González as Elenita

References

External links

De mujeres Opening credits

1990 telenovelas
RCTV telenovelas
Venezuelan telenovelas
1990 Venezuelan television series debuts
1991 Venezuelan television series endings
Spanish-language telenovelas
Television shows set in Caracas